James Quinn Wilson (May 27, 1931 – March 2, 2012) was an American political scientist and an authority on public administration. Most of his career was spent as a professor at UCLA and Harvard University. He was the chairman of the Council of Academic Advisors of the American Enterprise Institute, member of the President's Foreign Intelligence Advisory Board (1985–1990), and the President's Council on Bioethics. He was Director of Joint Center for Urban Studies at Harvard-MIT.

He was the former president of the American Political Science Association and a member of the American Academy of Arts and Sciences, the American Philosophical Society and Human Rights Foundation. He also was a co-author of a leading university textbook, American Government, and wrote many scholarly books and articles, and op-ed essays. He gained national attention for a 1982 article introducing the broken windows theory in The Atlantic. In 2003, he was awarded the Presidential Medal of Freedom by President George W. Bush.

Career 
He completed his B.A. at the University of Redlands in 1952, and he was its national collegiate debate champion in 1951 and 1952. He completed an M.A. (1957) and a Ph.D. (1959) in political science at the University of Chicago. From 1961 to 1987, he was the Shattuck Professor of Government at Harvard University.

His 1975 book Thinking About Crime put forward a novel theory of incapacitation as the most effective explanation for the reduction in crime rates observed where longer prison sentences were the norm. Criminals might not be deterred by the threat of longer sentences, but repeat offenders would be prevented from further offending, simply because they would be in jail rather than out on the street.

Wilson and George L. Kelling introduced the broken windows theory in the March 1982 edition of The Atlantic Monthly. In an article titled "Broken Windows", they argued that the symptoms of low-level crime and disorder (e.g. a broken window) create an environment that encourages more crimes, including serious ones.

From 1987 to 1997, he was the James Collins Professor of Management and Public Policy at the UCLA Anderson School of Management at UCLA. From 1998 to 2009, he was the Ronald Reagan Professor of Public Policy at Pepperdine University's School of Public Policy.

Wilson authored the university text American Government, and coauthored later editions with John J. DiIulio, Jr. The text has been widely sold, though its use became controversial in later years after universities alleged it to have inaccuracies and "right-wing bias".

Wilson was a former chairman of the White House Task Force on Crime (1966), of the National Advisory Commission on Drug Abuse Prevention (1972–1973) and a member of the Attorney General's Task Force on Violent Crime (1981), the President's Foreign Intelligence Advisory Board (1985–1990), and the President's Council on Bioethics. He was a former president of the American Political Science Association. He served on the board of directors for the New England Electric System (now National Grid USA), Protection One, RAND, and State Farm Mutual Insurance.

He was the chairman of the Council of Academic Advisors of the American Enterprise Institute. He was a member of the American Academy of Arts and Sciences, the American Philosophical Society, and the International Council of the New York-based Human Rights Foundation.

Political views 
Although as a young professor he "voted for John Kennedy, Lyndon Johnson and Hubert Humphrey and worked in the last's presidential campaign," Wilson was later recognized as a leading conservative scholar, as indicated by his advisory position to the American Enterprise Institute.

Wilson was a staunch advocate for perseverance in the War on Drugs:

Even now, when the dangers of drug use are well understood, many educated people still discuss the drug problem in almost every way except the right way. They talk about the "costs" of drug use and the "socioeconomic factors" that shape that use. They rarely speak plainly—drug use is wrong because it's immoral and it is immoral because it enslaves the mind and destroys the soul.

Wilson also pioneered the idea that public administration was increasingly replete with political calculations and concerns:

This is because our constitutional structure and our traditions afford individuals manifold opportunities not only to bring their special interests to the attention of public officials but also — and this the important thing — to compel officials to bargain and to make compromises. The nature of the governmental system gives private interests such good opportunities to participate in the making of public decisions that there is virtually no sphere of 'administration' apart from politics.

Wilson studied conflict between "amateur" and "professional" participants in politics, especially in the Democratic Party in the 1960s. He argued that professional politicians, parties, political machines and informal power structures were essential to the functioning of the government and its formal power structures. In 1962, he wrote that "If legal power is badly fragmented among many independent elective officials and widely decentralized among many levels of government, the need for informal methods of assembling power becomes great."

Personality 
Wilson was described as being courteous and gentle in demeanor but also intellectually tough and firm with his opinions. As a former student of Wilson, former American Enterprise Institute President Christopher DeMuth said, "He was sociable, amiable, he loved the Red Sox. He kept up on the NCAA brackets. He knew all about all of those things. He was interested in music and cooking and food, he was very companionable. But... he was intellectually tough as nails and he would be very agreeable in explaining to you that your intuitions about something actually weren't correct."

Personal Life 
James Quinn Wilson was born in Denver, Colorado, but grew up mostly in Long Beach, Calif. His father, Claude Wilson, worked as a salesman. His mother, Marie, was a stay-at-home mom.

He served in the US Navy during the Korean War, but was not in combat.

Wilson enjoyed scuba diving.

On September 13, 1952, Wilson married Roberta (Evans) Wilson; they originally met in high school, and remained married until his death, nearly sixty years later. The couple had two children: a son, Matthew, born in 1960, and a daughter, Annie, born in 1964.

Death 
Wilson died in Boston, Massachusetts, on March 2, 2012, from complications with leukemia.

Awards 
 Honorary doctorate from Brigham Young University, 1994
 Honorary doctorate from Harvard University
 Lifetime Achievement Award, American Political Science Association, 2001
 Presidential Medal of Freedom by President George W. Bush in 2003

Books 
 American Politics, Then and Now (2010)
 American Government, 12th ed. (2010, with John J. DiIulio, Jr.)
 Understanding America: The Anatomy of an Exceptional Nation (2008, ed. with Peter Schuck)
 The Marriage Problem: How Our Culture Damages Families (2002)
 Moral Judgment (1997)
 The Moral Sense (1993)
 On Character: Essays by James Q. Wilson (1991)
 Bureaucracy (1989) – "his masterwork"
 Crime and Human Nature (1985, with Richard Herrnstein)
 Watching Fishes: Life and Behavior on Coral Reefs (1985, with Roberta Wilson)
 The Politics of Regulation (1980)
 The Investigators (1978)
 Thinking About Crime (1975)
 Political Organizations (1973)
 Varieties of Police Behavior (1968)
 City Politics (1963, with Edward C. Banfield)
 The Amateur Democrat (1962)
 Negro Politics (1960)

Films 
 Vigilante Vigilante: The Battle for Expression (2011)

References

External links
 Biography at Boston College
 Wilson's page at Pepperdine's website
 
Interview at PBS
 James Q. Wilson Collection at the RAND Library
 No easy answers, an interview with Wilson in Reason
 Center for Inquiry's Textbook Accuracy Report [PDF]
 

American criminologists
American essayists
American non-fiction crime writers
American political scientists
American textbook writers
Boston College faculty
University of California, Los Angeles faculty
University of Chicago alumni
Harvard University faculty
Miller Center Affiliates
Writers from Denver
Presidential Medal of Freedom recipients
The American Spectator people
University of Redlands alumni
Public administration scholars
1931 births
2012 deaths
American male essayists